"Crucial" is New Edition's fourth single from the Heart Break album. The single featured production from Jellybean Johnson, Spencer Bernard, and Jimmy Jam and Terry Lewis. "Crucial" hit No. 4 on the Billboard R&B singles chart. It was featured on the License to Drive soundtrack.

Track listings
 Crucial (12" Dance Remix) – 8:00
 Crucial (12" Dub) – 5:10
 Crucial (Acapella) – 4:30

Personnel
Ronnie DeVoe: background vocals
Ricky Bell: background vocals
Michael Bivins: background vocals
Ralph Tresvant: lead and background vocals
Johnny Gill: background vocals

References

1988 songs
1989 singles
New Edition songs
Song recordings produced by Jimmy Jam and Terry Lewis
Songs written by Jellybean Johnson
MCA Records singles